David Edward Johnson is an American politician and lawyer. He served as an Arkansas state senator from 2009 to 2017 and as an Arkansas state representative from 2005 until 2009. He is a member of the Democratic Party.

Personal life and education
Johnson earned a BA from Georgetown University in 1991 and a JD from the University of Arkansas School of Law in 1997. Johnson is the father of three daughters: Sydney, Emery, and Ansley Johnson.

Career
Prior to serving in public office, Johnson served as a legislative aide to U.S. Senator Dale Bumpers, and was also a deputy prosecutor in Pulaski County. Johnson was elected to the Arkansas House of Representatives in 2004, and served there until he was elected to the Arkansas Senate in 2008. As a state senator, Johnson championed legislation to promote children's dental health. Johnson also authored legislation that created new energy savings programs for the State of Arkansas and municipalities and counties in the state.

In 2016, Johnson joined Central Arkansas Water as general counsel.

References

External links
 

Place of birth missing (living people)
Year of birth missing (living people)
Living people
Arkansas lawyers
Democratic Party Arkansas state senators
Georgetown University alumni
Democratic Party members of the Arkansas House of Representatives
University of Arkansas School of Law alumni
21st-century American politicians